Löbnitz is a municipality in the district of Nordsachsen, in Saxony, Germany. It has an area of 37.20 km² and a population of 2,250 (as of 31 December 2006).

Horse riding

Löbnitz has a strong horse riding community. The municipality is home to three horse riding clubs. The investment in horse breeding dates back to the Knights "von Schönberg".

References 

Nordsachsen